The round fantail stingray (Taeniurops grabatus) or round stingray, is a poorly known species of stingray in the family Dasyatidae. It inhabits sandy, muddy, or rocky coastal habitats in the eastern Atlantic Ocean and the southern Mediterranean Sea. The round fantail stingray hunts for fishes and crustaceans on the sea floor, and exhibits an aplacental viviparous mode of reproduction. The International Union for Conservation of Nature (IUCN) does not yet have sufficient information to assess the conservation status of this species.

Taxonomy
French naturalist Étienne Geoffroy Saint-Hilaire originally described the round fantail stingray in 1817 as Trygon grabatus, from the Latin grabatus meaning "bed". His account was published in the first volume of the folio Poissons du Nil, de la mer Rouge et de la Méditerranée. Subsequent authors moved this species to the genus Taeniura. No type specimens are known.

Distribution and habitat

The round fantail stingray is found on the tropical to subtropical waters of the eastern Atlantic from Mauritania to Angola, as well as off the Canary Islands, Madeira, and Cape Verde. This species in the Mediterranean Sea is occasionally sighted and appears to be frequent in the Gulf of Gabes and in Levantine waters. However, it cannot be considered a Lessepsian migrants, as reports of this species being present in the Red Sea appear erroneous.

Description
The round fantail stingray has a nearly circular pectoral fin disk slightly wider than long. The tail measures no longer than the disk length and bears one or more stinging spines on the upper surface. Replacement spines grow in front of the primary spine. There is a deep fin fold running beneath the tail from the level of the spine almost to the tip. The skin is mostly smooth, save for small dermal denticles found along the middle of the back from the spiracles to the tail spine, as well as three thorns on the "shoulders". The coloration is dark gray to brown to olive above, with various darker mottling, and off-white below.

Biology and ecology

Little is known of the natural history of the round fantail stingray. A predator of bottom-dwelling crustaceans and fishes, during the day this species can often be found partially buried in sediment, under ledges, or lying in the open spaces between reefs. Known parasites of the round fantail stingray include the monogeneans Dendromonocotyle taeniurae and Neoentobdella apiocolpos, which infest the skin, and Heterocotyle forcifera, H. mokhtarae, and H. striata, which infest the gills, and the tapeworm Rhinebothrium monodi, which infests the spiral valve intestine. It has been observed being attended to by the cleaner shrimp Hippolysmata grabhami. Like other stingrays, this species is aplacental viviparous.

Human interactions
Potential threats to the round fantail stingray are commercial fisheries utilizing bottom trawls and trammel nets, but no specific data on utilization or population impact are available. Therefore, the International Union for Conservation of Nature (IUCN) has listed this species as Data Deficient. It has been observed sheltering near artificial reefs in the Canary Islands.

References

External links
 

round fantail stingray
Marine fauna of West Africa
round fantail stingray
Taxa named by Étienne Geoffroy Saint-Hilaire
Taxobox binomials not recognized by IUCN